Poznan Science and Technology Park (PPNT), founded in 1995, is the first Science and Technology Park of its kind in Poland. According to Polish publication Money.pl, in 2010 it was selected as the best technology park in Poland.

It is located in the north district of Poznań (Wielkopolska region), Naramowice. A non-profit managed by the Adam Mickiewicz University Foundation, it is intended to support science and industry by such services as conducting research, offering technological consultations, training small and medium-sized enterprises, and offering guidance on technology transfer and international co-operation.

History
Founded in 1995 by the Adam Mickiewicz University Foundation, the Poznan Science and Technology Park was the first science and technology park to operate under market conditions in Poland. Intended to foster business and increase ties between local business and the university, PPNT initially struggled with its goal, with 2003's The Human Geography of East Central Europe characterizing their results as "somewhat disappointing." However, the park continued its own development, receiving significant public funding and expanding in size and services until, according to Polish publication Money.pl, in 2010 it was selected as the best technology park in Poland.

Goals 
PPNT is focused on the incubation of start-ups and technology companies, support and promotion of innovation and innovative companies, co-operation of science and business, research on new technologies and their improvement, conversion of scientific results into technological innovations and participation in the economical development of the region by encouraging entrepreneurs.

International cooperation 

PSTP participates in many international project and networks, which include Regional Contact Point for 7 Framework EU Program and Technology Transfer Department which is a member of  Enterprise Europe Network. PSTP is also a member of International Association of Science Parks (IASP). Poznan Science and Technology Park is also active in domestic and regional cooperation with other science parks, local government institutions, business support organisations, universities innovation and technology transfer centres and cooperation chambers.

Research services 

PPNT offers many research services for science, economy and companies delivered by its research centres: 

Centre of Advanced Chemical Technology
Chemical Technology Incubator
Analytical Laboratory
Poznan Radiocarbon Laboratory 14C
Archaeology Rescue Research Centre
Centre of Information Technologies
Centre of Analysis and Medical Diagnostics
Isotopic Laboratory
Speech and Language Technology Laboratory
The Center for Optics and Optometry
Waste Management Centre

References

Further reading

External links

Science parks in Poland
Poznań